Charles O'Connell may refer to:
Charlie O'Connell, American actor and reality television personality.
Charles O'Connell (Irish politician)
Charles K. O'Connell, Kentucky Secretary of State, see Political party strength in Kentucky
Charles O'Connell (music producer)

See also

Charlie O'Connell (disambiguation)
Charles Connell (disambiguation)